Linda Cimino is an American basketball coach and former player. She has been the women's basketball head coach at St. Francis College since 2018. Cimino was born in Lincoln, Rhode Island and is an alumnus of North Smithfield High School and Adelphi University. Cimino began her head coaching career at Queensborough Community College in 2001 and is currently the 13th head coach of the St. Francis Brooklyn Terriers women's program. She had previously coached at Caldwell and Binghamton Universities.

Coaching career

St. Francis Brooklyn Terriers
Cimino was formally announced as the head coach of the Terriers on May 21, 2018. She became the 13th head coach in program history. Previously, Cimino was the head coach at Binghamton. In Cimino's first year at the helm, she set the Terrier record for conference wins in a season, 12.

In the 2019–20 season, Cimino recorded her 200th career win on December 4.

Head coaching record

NCAA Division I

NCAA Division II

References

Living people
Adelphi Panthers women's basketball coaches
Basketball coaches from Rhode Island
Basketball players from Rhode Island
People from Providence County, Rhode Island
St. Francis Brooklyn Terriers women's basketball coaches
Year of birth missing (living people)
Binghamton Bearcats women's basketball coaches